Ștefan cel Mare is a commune in Vaslui County, Western Moldavia, Romania. It is composed of seven villages: Bârzești, Brăhășoaia, Călugăreni, Cănțălărești, Mărășeni, Muntenești and Ștefan cel Mare.

References

Communes in Vaslui County
Localities in Western Moldavia